Thomas or Tom Baxter may refer to:

Thomas Baxter (mathematician) ( 1732–1740), British mathematician and schoolmaster
Tom Baxter (born 1973), English singer
Tom Baxter (Australian footballer) (1884–1959), Australian footballer
Tom Baxter (footballer, born 1893) (1893–?), English footballer who played for Chelsea and Gillingham
Tom Baxter (footballer, born 1903) (1903–1987), English footballer who played for Wolverhampton Wanderers and Port Vale
Thomas Baxter (painter) (1782–1821), English painter
Tommy Baxter ( 1930–2014), New Zealand rugby league player